Sulisławice may refer to the following places in Poland:
Sulisławice, Świdnica County in Lower Silesian Voivodeship (south-west Poland)
Sulisławice, Trzebnica County in Lower Silesian Voivodeship (south-west Poland)
Sulisławice, Ząbkowice Śląskie County in Lower Silesian Voivodeship (south-west Poland)
Sulisławice, Lesser Poland Voivodeship (south Poland)
Sulisławice, Świętokrzyskie Voivodeship (south-central Poland)